Stapleford Miniature Railway is an historic steam locomotive-hauled  gauge railway at Stapleford Park, Stapleford near Melton Mowbray in Leicestershire, England.

Considered one of the finest examples of its type, the railway is now private but still attracts thousands of visitors from the UK and abroad during its two public charity events each year.

History
The ridable miniature railway began life in 1958 as a short line to carry visitors from the car park, to Lord Gretton's stately home. Due to its popularity, the railway was quickly expanded, running down to and then eventually around the lake in the landscaped parkland and the park which also featured a drive through lion reserve.

The SMR featured in a 1965 episode of the television show The Avengers called "The Gravediggers", where Emma Peel (played by Diana Rigg), was tied to the railway track, before Steed rescued her just in time.

After the estate closed its doors to the public in 1982, the railway was mothballed. It was restored by the newly formed friends supporting group FSMR under Jennifer Gretton, Baroness Gretton's stewardship during the 1990s and opened its doors to the public again in 1995. The railway opens twice per year as part of steam rallies in mid June and August Bank Holiday weekends, in aid of LOROS, the local hospice. 

In October 2008 a new station was opened by Pete Waterman OBE.

Route

Locomotives
There is a fleet of seven steam and one diesel locomotive, including a 1/5th scale NKP Berkshire class, 1/5th scale NYC Niagara, 1/4 scale East African, 1/4th scale Harbours 31 Class.

IMechE Railway Challenge
During the summer 2012, the Institution of Mechanical Engineers held the inaugural "Railway Challenge" event at the SMR. This was aimed at university students and rail company graduates and apprentices. It was designed to expand their knowledge of railway engineering through a series of challenges, involving construction of a 10 inches locomotive to a demanding specification. The locomotives were of hybrid design, utilising innovative energy recovery systems. For the first event in 2012 4 teams participated with teams from Manchester Metropolitan University, Birmingham University, Interfleet Technology of Derby in addition to an independent entry from Derby. The inaugural competition was won by the graduate team of Interfleet Technology, producing a Petrol-Electric locomotive of Bo-Bo construction, utilizing supercapacitors for energy storage. A similar event was run at the end of June in 2013 with 4 teams once again and was won by the University of Huddersfield, entering for their first time. The 2014 event was entered by 5 teams: Interfleet Technology, University of Huddersfield, Birmingham University, London Underground, and Sheffield University. Unfortunately Sheffield was unable to attend the competition with their loco and as such only the other 4 teams competed. This event was won by London Underground, entering for their first time.

References

External links
Stapleford Miniature Railway official site

Avengers Tv Gravediggers episode
Railway Challenge
 Railway Challenge 2012 winners
 Railway Challenge 2012 Hydrogen powered Loco
Railway Challenge 2013 Winners
Railway Challenge 2013 Rail Engineer article
Railway Challenge 2014 Rail Engineer article

10¼ in gauge railways in England
Miniature railways in the United Kingdom
Tourist attractions in Leicestershire
Rail transport in Leicestershire